Meerbeek is a village in the Belgian province of Flemish Brabant and is the part of the municipality of Kortenberg, along with Everberg, Erps-Kwerps and Kortenberg. The village borders the villages of Veltem-Beisem (Herent), Bertem, Erps-Kwerps and Everberg. The area comprises 515 ha.

Populated places in Flemish Brabant
Kortenberg